Crosshill is a village in Fife, Scotland, located just to the south of the village of Lochore, and to the east of Loch Ore.

History
Crosshill was the scene of a murder by one of Scotland's youngest murderers. Nicolle Earley was 16 when she killed Ann Gray in her home in Crosshill on 14 November 2008.

Notable residents
 Richard Jobson

Sport

References 

Villages in Fife
Mining communities in Fife